The Lagos State Ministry of Justice is the state government ministry, concerned with the administration of justice.
The Ministry is under the coordination of the Attorney-General and Commissioner for Justice, who is often assisted by the Solicitor-General and Permanent Secretary.

Mission
Working together to serve the people by professional and ethical standard to promote access to justice regardless of socio-economic class and to attract, develop, motivate and retain the best law officers within a supportive work environment.

Vision
To be the public legal service that promote integrity, values innovations, and a tradition where merit is the primary key to advancement.

Responsibility 
The ministry focuses on legislative reforms and initiatives. Particularly in the domain of public law and the strengthening of the legal environment to encourage economic activity. Its mission is to promote and improve justice for all residents.

See also
Lagos State Ministry of Physical Planning and Urban Development
Lagos State Executive Council

References

Government ministries of Lagos State
Lagos